Lickey is a 'Linear Development', as opposed to a village, in the north of Worcestershire, England approximately  south west from the centre of Birmingham. It lies in Bromsgrove District and is situated on the Lickey Ridge, amongst the Lickey Hills, its proximity to countryside and the city makes it a popular commuter area. The civil parish of Lickey and Blackwell has a population of 4,140.

The name of Lickey dating back to 1225 is thought to have derived from 'leac' (a clearing) and 'hey' (an enclosed space), including perhaps referring to a clearing in the forest. Various names have included La Lecheye, La Lekeheye, Lechay, Lekhaye. The area forms part of the Lickey Hills Country Park which covers 524 acres.

People
The Birmingham-born watercolourist Elijah Walton (1832–1880) lived at Beacon Farm in Lickey towards the end of his life, and died there in 1880. The area was populated rapidly from the 1870s onwards by professionals and industrialists such as Herbert Austin, who moved to Lickey Grange in 1910 and lived there until his death in 1941.  He is buried in the graveyard of the local church of Holy Trinity. The First World War fighter ace Oliver Bryson was born in Lickey on 18 August 1896. The author Jonathan Coe was born in Lickey in 1961. Today the area has a mainly professional and entrepreneurial population.

Landmarks
Opposite Holy Trinity Church, Lickey is a drinking trough for horses and drinking fountain for travellers.

The Monument, a 60–80 ft tall obelisk, is situated behind the trees bordering the old Birmingham road directly opposite the petrol station in Lickey. The inscription reads "To commend to imitation the exemplary private virtues of Other Archer 6th Earl of Plymouth". The Earl had land at Tardebigge, near Lickey.

Houses
Lickey has some late Victorian houses but there was steady development of housing in the 20th century. Since the 1990s, there has been 'infill' housing.

Transport
Lickey is served by hourly buses to Bromsgrove, Rubery, Droitwich and Halesowen. These are operated by Diamond Bus. The nearest railway station is Longbridge in Rubery with a frequent West Midlands Trains service to Birmingham New Street.

See also
Barnt Green
Lickey Incline
Lickey Hills Country Park
Cofton Hackett

References

External links

Villages in Worcestershire